Aidanfield is a suburb in the south-west of Christchurch, New Zealand, about  from the city centre.  The land, which had been owned by the Good Shepherd Sisters since 1886, now incorporates the Mount Magdala Institute and the St John of God Chapel, which has a Category I heritage listing by the New Zealand Historic Places Trust (now Heritage New Zealand). The first residents moved into the suburb in 2002.  The developer caused controversy in 2007–2008 by applying to have a group of farm buildings demolished to allow for further subdivision. Christchurch City Council was widely criticised for approving the demolition despite the buildings having had a heritage listing in the Christchurch City Plan.

Geography
Aidanfield is located between Halswell Road (State Highway 75), Dunbars Road, the Christchurch Southern Motorway, the Canterbury Agricultural Park (home of the Canterbury A&P Show) and Templetons Road.

Historic background
Father Laurence Ginaty established the Mount Magdala Institute in 1886 to provide a home for women and girls.  It developed into an institution caring for women recently released from prison, orphans, and "unruly girls".  Numerous buildings were constructed, and at its peak in the 1930s, 500 people lived on the complex.  The St John of God Chapel, designed by Sidney and Alfred Luttrell and now listed as a Category I heritage structure by Heritage New Zealand, was completed in 1912.

The Catholic order owned all the land around Mount Magdala, and decided to develop most of it as a subdivision to provide them with financial support.  The Press first reported in mid-2000 on the subdivision plans.

Naming
The suburb is named after Mother Aidan Phelan (1858–1958), the Superior at Mount Magdala from 1907 to 1920 and again from 1929 to 1936. Mother Aidan was herself named after the Irish saint Aidan of Lindisfarne. The name Aidanfield was approved on 31 January 2001.

Demographics

Aidanfield had a population of 3,903 at the 2018 New Zealand census, an increase of 1,011 people (35.0%) since the 2013 census, and an increase of 2,607 people (201.2%) since the 2006 census. There were 1,242 households. There were 1,842 males and 2,064 females, giving a sex ratio of 0.89 males per female. The median age was 38.1 years (compared with 37.4 years nationally), with 744 people (19.1%) aged under 15 years, 717 (18.4%) aged 15 to 29, 1,746 (44.7%) aged 30 to 64, and 699 (17.9%) aged 65 or older.

Ethnicities were 64.0% European/Pākehā, 3.8% Māori, 1.2% Pacific peoples, 33.1% Asian, and 2.7% other ethnicities (totals add to more than 100% since people could identify with multiple ethnicities).

The proportion of people born overseas was 35.9%, compared with 27.1% nationally.

Although some people objected to giving their religion, 46.6% had no religion, 43.9% were Christian, 1.5% were Hindu, 0.8% were Muslim, 1.5% were Buddhist and 1.4% had other religions.

Of those at least 15 years old, 960 (30.4%) people had a bachelor or higher degree, and 465 (14.7%) people had no formal qualifications. The median income was $33,600, compared with $31,800 nationally. The employment status of those at least 15 was that 1,488 (47.1%) people were employed full-time, 456 (14.4%) were part-time, and 69 (2.2%) were unemployed.

Subdivision development and amenities
The first residents moved into Aidanfield in 2002, and by 2011 some 400 sections had been built on; when the subdivision is fully developed, more than 50 new roads will have been created. The 2006 New Zealand census reported 1320 residents in the Aidanfield area unit. Statistics New Zealand have estimated the suburb's 2010 population at 2400 residents.

The subdivision developer caused controversy in 2007 after applying to have four of the five historic Magdala Farm buildings demolished to make way for further subdivision. Although the buildings were protected in the Christchurch City Council District Plan, councillors voted eight to four in favour of granting demolition consent. Staff advice to councillors had been that the "farm buildings in their current form have high regional and moderate national heritage significance and therefore should be considered with the Deans' farm buildings to be the most significant heritage farm buildings remaining in Christchurch." The consent was appealed by Environment Canterbury and the Halswell Residents' Association to the Environment Court, with the New Zealand Historic Places Trust as a supporting party, but the demolition went ahead.

Education
The Halswell Residential College is a school for boys with learning difficulties, from years 7 to 10. After the 2011 Christchurch earthquake, Discovery 1 School and Unlimited Paenga Tawhiti (UPT) used the campus of this school. UPT moved to Ilam in 2013, whilst Discovery 1 remained at the Halswell Residential College, until the two schools, now merged as Ao Tawhiti, moved to a new site in the central city.

Aidanfield Christian School is a state-integrated school for years 1 to 10.

References

External links
 Information about Mount Magdala

Suburbs of Christchurch